Marian McDougall (September 2, 1913 – May 14, 2009) was an American amateur golfer from Portland, Oregon. She married a man named Joseph Herron and is sometimes referred to an Marian Herron or Marian McDougall Herron. She was a third generation member of Waverley Country Club. In 1934, she won the Women's Western Open, which was later designated as a major championship by the LPGA. She was inducted into Pacific Northwest Golf Hall of Fame in 1979.

Tournaments wins
This is a selective list.
Pacific Northwest Golf Association Women's Amateur Championship: 1934, 1936, 1937, 1938, 1939, 1948;
Women's Western Open: 1934
Oregon Women's Amateur Championship: 1936, 1937, 1939, 1940
Oregon Women's Open Amateur Championship: 1935
Oregon Junior Girls' Championship: 1930, 1931

Major championships

Wins (1)

External links
Pacific Northwest Golf Association Hall of Fame profile, archived 2014-05-02
Marion Herron's obituary

American female golfers
Amateur golfers
Winners of LPGA major golf championships
Golfers from Portland, Oregon
1913 births
2009 deaths
20th-century American women
21st-century American women